Judo at the 2021 Islamic Solidarity Games was held in Konya, Turkey from 15 to 17 August 2022.

Medalists

Men's events

Women's events

Medal table

Participating nations
198 judokas from 36 countries participated:

References

External links
 Official website
 Brackets
 Team results
 

2021 Islamic Solidarity Games
2021
Islamic Solidarity Games
Islamic Solidarity Games
Islamic Solidarity Games